BNW may refer to:

 Brave New Waves, a former CBC Radio One show
 Brave New Workshop, a comedy club in Minneapolis, Minnesota
 Brave New World, a 1932 dystopian novel by Aldous Huxley
 Bootle New Strand railway station (station code), centre of Bootle, Sefton, England
 British NorthWest Airlines (ICAO airline code), a former airline from Blackpool, England